Lampman Airport  is located adjacent to Lampman, Saskatchewan, Canada.

See also 
Lampman/Spitfire Air Aerodrome
List of airports in Saskatchewan

References 

Registered aerodromes in Saskatchewan
Browning No. 34, Saskatchewan